The 146th Airlift Wing (146 AW) is a unit of the California Air National Guard, stationed at Channel Islands Air National Guard Station, Oxnard, California.  If activated to federal service, the Wing is gained by the United States Air Force Air Mobility Command.
 
The 115th Airlift Squadron assigned to the Wings 146th Operations Group, is a descendant organization of the 115th Observation Squadron, established on 16 June 1924. It is one of the 29 original National Guard Observation Squadrons of the United States Army National Guard formed before World War II.  It is the oldest unit in the California Air National Guard, having almost 90 years of service to the state and nation.

Mission
The 146th AW's primary mission is to provide global military airlift capability to a full spectrum of state and federal agencies. Flying the Lockheed C-130J Super Hercules aircraft, the 146th has provided humanitarian relief in the aftermath of hurricanes, earthquakes, floods, and other disasters, in California, the United States and internationally.

The 146th is one of four C-130 ANG units whose contribution to the United States' aerial fire fighting capability includes equipment and techniques for efficient, effective suppression of large wildland fires from the air. Since 1974, using the Modular Airborne Fire Fighting System (MAFFS) units supplied by the US Forest Service and mounted in four C-130s, the wing's aerial fire fighting crews have been credited with saving many lives and countless millions of dollars worth of structures, forests, and brush land in California and other states and countries.

MAFFS II was used for the first time on a fire in July 2010, using the latest generation Lockheed Martin C-130J Super Hercules aircraft. The 146th Airlift Wing was the first to transition to the MAFFS 2 system in 2008, and it remains the only unit flying the new system on the C-130J aircraft.

Units
The 146th Airlift Wing consists of the following units:
 146th Operations Group
 115th Airlift Squadron
 146th Aeromedical Evacuation Squadron
 146th Contingency Response Flight
 146th Mission Support Group
 146th Security Forces Squadron
 146th Maintenance Group
 146th Medical Group

History

World War II
 see: 373d Fighter Group for expanded World War II history
Formed at Westover Field, Massachusetts, in August 1943. During World War II the 373d Fighter Group was assigned to the European Theater of Operations (ETO), Ninth Air Force, in Western Europe. It was equipped with P-47 Thunderbolts.

The Group flew its first combat mission on 8 May 1944, a fighter sweep over Normandy. It then took part in pre-invasion activities (e.g., escorting B-26 Marauders to attack airdromes, bridges, and railroads in Occupied France). The Group patrolled the air over the beachhead when the Allies launched the Normandy invasion on 6 June 1944, and hit troops, tanks, roads, fuel depots, and other targets in the assault area until the end of the month.

The Group moved to the Continent in July 1944 where it struck railroads, hangars, boxcars, warehouses, and other objectives to prevent reinforcements from reaching the front at St. Lo, where the Allies broke through on 25 July 1944. The Group bombed such targets as troops in the Falaise-Argentan area in August 1944. During the Battle of the Bulge (December 1944 – January 1945), the Group concentrated on the destruction of bridges, marshalling yards, and highways. It flew reconnaissance missions to support ground operations in the Rhine Valley in March 1945, hitting airfields, motor transports, etc. The Group continued tactical air operations until 4 May 1945.

Returned to the United States and prepared for transfer to the Pacific Theater during the Summer of 1945, the Japanese Capitulation in August led to the Group's inactivation in November 1945.

California Air National Guard

The wartime 373d Fighter Group was re-designated as the 146th Fighter Group, and was allotted to the California Air National Guard, on 24 May 1946. It was organized at Van Nuys Airport, Los Angeles, California, and was extended federal recognition on 16 September by the National Guard Bureau. The 146th Fighter Group was bestowed the lineage, history, honors, and colors of the 373d Fighter Group. The Group was assigned to the California ANG 62nd Fighter Wing.

Upon activation, operational squadrons of the 146th Fighter Group were:
 195th Fighter Squadron, Van Nuys Airport, California
 196th Fighter Squadron, San Bernardino Army Air Field, California
 197th Fighter Squadron, Luke Army Airfield, Arizona

The 196th, 197th, and 198th Fighter Squadrons were all re-designations of the 373d Fighter Group's operational squadrons during World War II. All of the fighter squadrons were initially equipped with F-51D Mustangs, with a mission of air defense of Southern California and Arizona. The 115th was equipped with B-26 Invader light bombers, gained by Tactical Air Command. Other components were the 146th Headquarters, 146th Material Squadron (Maintenance), 146th Combat Support Squadron, and the 1146th USAF Dispensary.

During World War II, Van Nuys Airport had been used as an Army Airfield and the organization moved into several buildings and hangars vacated just a few months previously by the 441st Army Air Force Base Unit.

146th Composite Wing

At the end of October 1950, the Air National Guard converted to the wing-base (Hobson Plan) organization. As a result, the 62d Fighter Wing was withdrawn from the California ANG and was inactivated on 31 October 1950. The 146th Composite Wing was established by the National Guard Bureau, allocated to the state of California, recognized and activated 1 November 1950; assuming the personnel, equipment, and mission of the inactivated 62d Fighter Wing.

The 146th Composite Group was assigned to the new wing as its operational group with the three fighter squadrons. The 115th Bombardment Squadron (Light) at Van Nuys Airport was transferred from the 62d Fighter Wing to the new 144th Composite Wing.   The 115th was a re-designation of the original California National Guard pre-war 115th Observation Squadron with origins dating to 1917.

Korean War federalization
With the surprise invasion of South Korea on 25 June 1950, and the regular military's complete lack of readiness, most of the Air National Guard was federalized placed on active duty. The 146th Fighter Wing was federalized on 1 March 1951 and assigned to Tactical Air Command. It was re-designated as the 146th Fighter-Bomber Wing and moved to Moody AFB, Georgia, where it was assigned two federalized ANG squadrons from Idaho and Montana and became a F-51D Fighter-Bomber training unit.   

 The 115th Bomb Squadron was moved to Langley AFB, Virginia, where it became a training unit for B-45A Tornado jet bomber crews.
 The 195th Fighter Squadron remained at Van Nuys however it was placed under the Air Defense Command 28th Air Division. It was re-equipped with long-range F-51H Mustangs and became part of the air defense forces for Southern California.
 The 196th Fighter Squadron was assigned to the Georgia ANG 116th Fighter-Bomber Wing, re-equipped with F-84D Thunderjets and deployed to Japan and South Korea where it engaged in combat over Korea.
 The 197th Fighter Squadron stayed at Luke AFB, Arizona where it was assigned to the 127th Fighter-Bomber Wing, equipped with F-84A Thunderjets, and was a training unit for F-84 pilots heading to the Korean War.

The units were returned to California State control in November 1952, and on 1 January 1953, the 146th Fighter-Bomber Wing was reformed at Van Nuys Airport.

Air Defense Command

With the end of combat in Korea, jet-propelled aircraft began to be made available to the Air National Guard. In 1953, the 195th at Van Nuys received F-86A Sabres, to be used in day-interceptor missions. The 195th's F-51Hs were reassigned to the 115th, now a Fighter-Bomber Squadron (FBS); the 115th was upgraded to F-86As in late 1953. In 1954, the 196th FBS at Norton AFB was equipped with F-86As, and the 197th at Luke AFB also being upgraded to F-86As. With the F-86A, the squadrons began standing dusk-to-dawn alerts, joining its Air Defense Command active-duty counterparts. On 1 January 1954, the 196th FBS was moved from the expanding Norton AFB to Ontario Municipal Airport. The 146th was re-designated the 146th Fighter-Interceptor Wing (FIW) on 1 July 1955.

The 146th FIW continued to fly the F-86A until 31 March 1958. On 1 April 1958, the transition was made to the F-86L Sabre Interceptor, which was designed from the onset as an interceptor, had all-weather capability, and thus was able to be used in all weather. In addition, the F-86L could be controlled and directed by the SAGE computer-controlled Ground Control Interceptor (Radar) sites which would vector the aircraft to the unidentified target for interception.

In 1958, the 196th Fighter-Bomber Squadron at Ontario Airport was authorized to expand to a group level. The 163d Fighter-Interceptor Group was federally recognized on 17 May; the 196th FBS was re-designated as a Fighter-Interceptor Squadron and transferred to the new group under California ANG jurisdiction. On 2 October 1957, the 197th FBS at Luke AFB was expanded into the 161st Fighter-Interceptor Group, and came under Arizona ANG jurisdiction.

Strategic Airlift
In 1961, the 146th FIW was reassigned to Military Air Transport Service (MATS), trading in its Sabre interceptors for 4-engined C-97 Stratofreighter transports. With air transportation recognized as a critical wartime need, the 146th was re-designated the 146th Air Transport Wing (Heavy). During the Berlin Crisis of 1961, both the Wing and squadrons were federalized on 1 October 1961. From Van Nuys, the wing augmented MATS airlift capability worldwide in support of the Air Force's needs. It returned again to California state control on 31 August 1962. Throughout the 1960s, the unit flew long-distance transport missions in support of Air Force requirements, frequently sending aircraft to Hawaii, Japan, the Philippines, and, during the Vietnam War, to both South Vietnam, Okinawa, and Thailand.

The C-97s were retired in 1970 and the unit was transferred to Tactical Air Command (TAC). It transitioned to the C-130A Hercules theater transport, flying missions in support of TAC throughout the United States and Alaska. In 1973, the C-130A models were transferred to the Republic of Vietnam Air Force and they were replaced by the C-130B. During this period, both the 115th and its sister squadron, the 195th Tactical Airlift Squadron shared the same pool of aircraft.

With the end of the Vietnam War, the California National Guard bureau began to downsize the 146th Tactical Airlift Wing (TAS) as part of the post-war drawdown. With C-130s units being transferred to Military Airlift Command, the junior 195th TAS was inactivated on 30 September 1974. The personnel, equipment, and aircraft of the 195th TFS were reassigned to the 115th TAS.

In the early 1970s, USAF's "Total Force" policy brought the wing into full partnership with its Air Force counterparts by mandating co-operation and teamwork between Air Guard and active duty Air Force units in all phases of military airlift operations. As a result, in succeeding years the wing's C-130s traveled to all corners of the world, airlifting troops, passengers, and cargo during training missions, exercise deployments, and real-world military operations to support Federal and State military airlift requirements.

The 146th is one of only four C-130 Air Guard and AF Reserve units whose contribution to the nation's aerial fire fighting capability includes equipment and techniques for efficient, effective suppression of large wildland fires from the air. Since 1974, using the Modular Airborne Fire Fighting System (MAFFS) units supplied by the U.S. Forest Service and mounted in four C-130s, the wing's aerial fire fighting crews have been credited with saving many lives and countless millions of dollars worth of structures, forests, and brush land in California, and many other States and countries as well, taking part in over 5,000 aerial firefighting missions in California and across the Western United States saving valuable property, natural resources, and lives. The fire seasons of 1993 and 1994 were the worst on record. The Malibu fires of 1993 literally burned to the edge of the 146th AW's base. But it was in 1994, with over 55,000 wildfires raging throughout the western States, that the 146th, along with three other MAFFS-equipped guard and reserve units flew nearly 2,000 missions, dropping fifty-one million pounds of fire retardant.

The 146th TAW and its subordinate units participated in numerous Cold War military exercises such as Team Spirit, Volant Oak, Red Flag, and Reforger. Other Joint Chief of Staff exercises included "Ember Dawn IV" in Alaska and "Brave Shield" in Europe. In 1979, the Air National Guard and Air Force Reserve assumed full responsibility for airlift operations in Panama, which recently moved to Puerto Rico, a commitment still fulfilled.

In mid-December 1989, and continuing for several weeks, wing aircraft, air crews, and support personnel on deployment for exercise Volant Oak at Howard AFB, Canal Zone, Panama, flew combat airlift missions for U. S. Southern Command during Operation "Just Cause" in Panama. More than 100 combat sorties were flown by 146th aircraft and crews, with no casualties or damage to aircraft.

Channel Islands Air National Guard Station

In December 1988, after more than six decades of Air National Guard flying tradition in the San Fernando Valley, the 146th Airlift Wing began moving from Van Nuys to a brand new facility, built on Federal land leased to the State of California, adjacent to the Naval Air Warfare Center Weapons Division, an active duty Navy flying installation.

The 146th operates from the military airfield at the Naval Air Warfare Center Weapons Division, along with Navy and other Federal aviation activities. By March 1990, all but a small remnant of wing personnel had transferred operations to Channel Islands ANG Station. Shortly thereafter, the old Van Nuys facility was closed and turned over to the City of Los Angeles. On 30 April 1990, the flag at Van Nuys ANG Base was lowered for the last time during a special ceremony.

The addition of a C-130 flight simulator facility is planned. Construction was delayed in 2019 when the funds allocated by Congress were diverted to build the border wall due to a Declaration of National Emergency.

Persian Gulf
In August 1990, the world was moving swiftly toward armed confrontation in the Persian Gulf. By late January 1991, the 146th Airlift Wing had provided U.S. Central Command and U.S. Air Forces in Europe more than 650 personnel, voluntarily and involuntarily activated, who participated in Operations Desert Shield and Desert Storm. Aircraft and air crews from the 115th Airlift Squadron flew two-month-long tours of duty in Operation Volant Pine, a backfill of military airlifters to Europe by Air National Guard C-130s.

In 1997, wing members deployed in excess of 10,000 days supporting State and Federal missions. During the period the unit played critical roles in support of DoD missions deploying to Oman and Saudi Arabia in support of Southern Watch, and in peacetime humanitarian airlift and aerial fire fighting, among the many missions accomplished by the wing during the award period.

Lineage

 Constituted as 373d Fighter Group on 25 May 1943
 Activated on 15 August 1943
 Inactivated on 7 November 1945
 Re-designated 146th Fighter Group. Allotted to California ANG on 24 May 1946.
 Extended federal recognition on 16 September 1946
 Established as: 146th Composite Wing  and allotted to California ANG, 31 October 1950
 Organized and received federal recognition, 1 November 1950, assuming personnel and equipment of 62d Fighter Wing (Inactivated)
 Group re-designated: 146th Composite Group, assigned as subordinate unit
 Re-designated: 146th Fighter Wing on 1 February 1951
 Group re-designated 146th Fighter Group
 Federalized and placed on active duty, 1 March 1951
 Re-designated: 146th Fighter-Bomber Wing on 1 June 1951
 Group re-designated 146th Fighter-Bomber Group
 Released from active duty and returned to California state control, 11 December 1952
 Re-designated: 146th Fighter-Interceptor Wing, 1 July 1955
 Group re-designated 146th Fighter-Interceptor Group
 Re-designated: 146th Air Transport Wing, 1 October 1961
 Group re-designated 146th Air Transport Group
 Federalized and placed on active duty, 1 October 1961
 Released from active duty and returned to California state control, 31 August 1962
 Re-designated: 146th Military Airlift Wing, 8 January 1966
 Group re-designated 146th Military Airlift Group
 Re-designated: 146th Tactical Airlift Wing, 1 April 1970
 Group re-designated 146th Tactical Airlift Group
 146th Tactical Airlift Group inactivated 30 June 1974
 Re-designated: 146th Airlift Wing, 16 March 1992
 Group re-activated and re-designated 146th Operations Group

Assignments
 I Fighter Command, 15 August 1943 – 15 March 1944
 Attached to: New York Fighter Wing, 23 October 1943 – 15 March 1944
 303d Fighter Wing
 Attached to: XIX Tactical Air Command, 4 April 1944
 Second Air Force, 4 August 1945
 First Air Force, 20 August – 7 November 1945
 62d Fighter Wing, 16 September 1946
 California Air National Guard, 1 November 1950
 Gained by: Fourth Air Force, Continental Air Command
 Tactical Air Command, 1 March 1951
 California Air National Guard, 11 December 1952
 Gained by: Tactical Air Command
 Gained by: 27th Air Division, Air Defense Command, 1 July 1955
 Gained by: Los Angeles Air Defense Sector, Air Defense Command, 1 July 1955
 Gained by: Western Transport Air Force, Military Air Transport Service, 1 October 1961
 Gained by: Twenty-Second Air Force, Military Airlift Command, 8 January 1966
 Gained by: Tactical Air Command, 1 April 1970
 Gained by: Air Combat Command, 1 June 1992
 Gained by: Air Mobility Command, 1 April 1997

Components
 146th Operations Group, 16 March 1992 – present
 410th Fighter Squadron, 15 August 1943 – 7 November 1945
 Re-designated: 195th Fighter (later Fighter-Interceptor; Air Transport; Military Airlift; Tactical Airlift) Squadron, 16 September 1946 – 1 March 1951; 1 January 1953 – 30 September 1974

 411th Fighter Squadron, 15 August 1943 – 7 November 1945
 Re-designated: 196th Fighter (later Fighter-Bomber, Fighter-Interceptor) Squadron, 9 November 1946 – 10 October 1950; 1 January 1953 – 17 May 1958

 412th Fighter Squadron, 15 August 1943 – 7 November 1945
 Re-designated: 197th Fighter (later Fighter-Bomber, Fighter-Interceptor) Squadron, 12 December 1946 – 1 February 1951; 1 November 1952 – 2 October 1957 (Arizona ANG)

 115th Bombardment (later Fighter; Fighter-Interceptor; Air Transport; Military Airlift; Tactial Airlift; Airlift) Squadron, 16 September 1946 – 1 April 1951; 1 November 1952 – Present
 146th Aeromedical Evacuation Squadron, 1 July 1961 – Present
 186th Fighter Squadron, 1 April 1951 – 15 November 1952 (Federalized Montana ANG)
 190th Fighter Squadron, 1 April 1951 – 15 November 1952 (Federalized Idaho ANG)
 195th Aeromedical Evacuation Flight, 1 July 1961 - 1 October 1967

Stations

 Westover Field, Massachusetts, 15 August 1943
 Norfolk Airport, Virginia, 23 October 1943
 Richmond Army Air Base, Virginia, 15 February – 15 March 1944
 RAF Woodchurch (AAF-419), England, 4 April – 4 July 1944
 Tour-en-Bessin Airfield (A-13), France, 19 July 1944
 Saint James Airfield (A-29), France, 19 August 1944
 Reims/Champagne Airfield (A-62), France, 19 September 1944
 Le Culot Airfield (A-89), Belgium, 22 October 1944
 Venlo Airfield (Y-55), Netherlands, 11 March 1945
 Lippstadt Airfield (Y-98), Germany, 20 April 1945
 AAF Station Illesheim, Germany, 20 May–July 1945

 Sioux Falls Army Air Field, South Dakota, 4 August 1945
 Seymour Johnson Field, North Carolina, 20 August 1945
 Mitchel Field, New York, 28 September – 7 November 1945
 Lockheed Air Terminal, Burbank, California, 1 February 1948 – 1 November 1952
 Operated from: Moody Air Force Base, Georgia, 1 April 1951 – 1 November 1952
 Van Nuys Airport, California, 16 September 1946; 1 January 1953 – 1 March 1990
 Channel Islands Air National Guard Station, Oxnard, California. 1 December 1988 – present

Aircraft

 P-47 Thunderbolt, 1943–1945
 A-26 Invader, 1946–1951
 F-51D Mustang, 1946–1953
 B-45 Tornado, 1951–1952
 F-51H Mustang, 1953
 F-86A Sabre, 1953–1957
 F-86F Sabre, 1957–1959

 F-86H Sabre, 1959–1961
 C-97C Stratofreighter, 1961–1970
 C-130A Hercules, 1970–1973
 C-130B Hercules, 1973–1981
 C-130E Hercules, 1981–2002
 C-130J Hercules, 2002 – present

Decorations
 Air Force Outstanding Unit Award

In popular culture
 Opening scenes of the 1959 movie A Stranger in My Arms were filmed in front of and inside the 146th's hangar at Van Nuys Airport.
 Scenes of the 1965 episode "Ed the Pilot" of the television show Mister Ed were shot at Van Nuys Airport in front of the hangar of the 146th Air Transportation Wing.
 C-97G 53-0356 of the 146th Air Transportation Wing, California Air National Guard can be see in the television show Mission Impossible in the 1967 Episode entitled "The Diamond" at 37 mins. The boarding ramp, when lowered, displays the numbers 1 4 6 followed by a 146th ATW wing emblem with a large X over it.
 A scene in the 1971 film The Hard Ride was filmed in front of the 146th Military Airlift Wing hangar. A C-97C is shown parked next to its replacement, the C-130A.
 The Bionic Woman episode "The Vega Influence" was shot around the hangar for the 146th Tactical Airlift Wing in 1976.
 The New Adventures of Wonder Woman episode "Flight to Oblivion" (Season 2 Episode 18) was shot around Van Nuys ANGB. The episode was aired on 3 March 1978. In the episode the base was named San Remo AFB. 
 The base was also used for Galactica 1980's "Galactica Discovers Earth" Part 3. It was aired on 10 February 1980.
 Special thanks was given during the credits of the movie The Silence of the Lambs to the 146th Tactical Airlift Wing for their assistance in the C-130 aerial scene.
 Special thanks was given during the credits of the movie Air Force One to the 146th Airlift Wing.
 Parts of the movie "Iron Eagle" were filmed on the airfield of the 146th Airlift Wing.
 Raid on Entebbe (film).
 Firefox.
 Call to Glory.

References

 Maurer, Maurer (1983). Air Force Combat Units of World War II. Maxwell AFB, Alabama: Office of Air Force History. .
 Johnson, David C. (1988), U.S. Army Air Forces Continental Airfields (ETO), D-Day to V-E Day; Research Division, USAF Historical Research Center, Maxwell AFB, Alabama.
 Van Nuys Airport Army Air Force Base Unit and  Air National Guard Site
 Rogers, B. (2006). United States Air Force Unit Designations Since 1978. 
 146th Airlift Wing@globalsecurity.org
 146th Airlift Wing website

External links

Wings of the United States Air National Guard
Military units and formations in California
0146